The 7th annual Venice International Film Festival was held from 31 August to 15 September 1946. It is the first edition after the suspension, from 1943 to 1945, for the Second World War. This edition is regarded as a second foundation of Venice Film Festival.
The prizes for the Best actor and other official prizes were not awarded: The prize for the Best film has lost the name of Mussolini Cup and above were unified into a single premium of the two (Best Foreign Film and Best Italian Film).
This edition marks the return of the films of the United States that were absent since 1939.

Jury

International Commission of journalists 
Francesco Pasinetti
 Umberto Barbaro
 Gino Visentini
 Francesco Callari
 Vinicio Marinucci
 Nikolaj Goršov
 Pierre Michaut

In Competition

Awards
Best Feature Film
The Southerner (Jean Renoir)
Volpi Cup
Best Actor - 
Best Actress -

References

External links
 
Venice Film Festival 1946 Awards on IMDb

1946 film festivals
1946 in Italy
Venice Film Festival
August 1946 events in Europe
September 1946 events in Europe
Film